Raymond Chassagne (February 13, 1924 – May 27, 2013) was a Haitian poet and essayist.

Early life
Chassagne was born in Jérémie, Haiti, and was a former officer in the Haitian army who was exiled after a political trial and imprisonment of nine months during President François Duvalier's regime.

References

1924 births
2013 deaths
20th-century Haitian poets
20th-century male writers
Haitian male poets
People from Port-au-Prince